Patrick Joseph may refer to:
 Patrick Joseph (musician)
 Patrick Joseph (footballer)